Chicken-n-Beer is the third studio album by American rapper Ludacris. It was released on October 7, 2003, by Disturbing tha Peace and Def Jam Recordings. Recording sessions took place from 2002 to 2003, and it was handled by several record producers, including DJ Nasty & LVM, Kanye West, Mo B. Dick, DJ Paul, Juicy J and Ludacris himself. The album, Chicken-n-Beer is musically similar to Ludacris' previous work, with his use of a fast, highly versatile flow. Some of the songs on the album take a political overtone.

The album debuted at number one on the US Billboard 200, selling 429,000 copies in its first week; unlike Ludacris' previous albums, the album achieved success outside the United States, charting in several European territories; including Germany and the United Kingdom. Upon its release, Chicken-n-Beer received positive reviews, with critics praising Ludacris' technical rapping abilities and production choices, although some criticized the adult humor in the lyrics as excessive. It was supported by four singles that were released from the album, two of which – "Stand Up" and "Splash Waterfalls" – became Ludacris' first to peak in the top 10 on the US Billboard Hot 100.

Lyrics and themes 
Ludacris frequently employs a fast-paced flow on Chicken-n-Beer, whilst often suffusing the words he raps with humorous punchlines and innuendos. Writing for BBC Music, Lewis Dene noted Ludacris to typically incorporate "lightning-quick phrasing, cutting wit and reference points a plenty" into his lyrics. Many of the songs on Chicken-n-Beer are of a predominantly sexual nature, and there were compared by Nathan Rabin of The A.V. Club, to the material recorded by the likes of the hip hop group 2 Live Crew. "Stand Up" was described as a "steamy sex rap", and "Hoes in My Room", a collaboration with fellow rapper Snoop Dogg, details a fictional encounter with a collection of groupies following a live performance. Rabin further observed that Ludacris addresses such topics with "irreverent glee", despite describing these themes "well-worn" and clichéd. Ludacris attacks political commentator Bill O'Reilly, who specifically criticized Ludacris for the content of his lyrics and noted him as a bad influence. "Blow It Out" and "Screwed Up" contain direct references to O'Reilly and his comments, as well as observations on the difficulties of fame.

Commercial performance 
The album debuted at number one on the US Billboard 200, becoming Ludacris' first album to top the chart: the overall first-week sales of 429,000 copies were an improvement on Ludacris' previous album Word of Mouf (2001), which sold 282,000 copies in its first week in the United States, debuting at number 3 on the Billboard 200. In its second week, Chicken-n-Beer fell to number 2, selling 194,000 copies, representing an overall sales decrease of 55% and bringing overall sales of the album to 623,000. The album spent five weeks inside the top ten of the chart, selling 936,000 copies in that time: it went on to spend a total of 45 weeks on the chart. It also peaked at number one on the US Top R&B/Hip-Hop Albums chart, although it remained on the chart for a longer length of time than on the Billboard 200, lasting a total of 51 weeks before exiting the chart. On June 18, 2004, the album was certified double platinum by the Recording Industry Association of America (RIAA) for shipments of 2,000,000 copies within the United States.

Unlike Ludacris' previous releases, Chicken-n-Beer achieved reasonable commercial success outside the United States. It became Ludacris' first album to chart in Australia, where it debuted and peaked at number 98, then exited the chart after a single week. The album peaked at number five on the Canadian Albums Chart: although it only spent a single week on the chart, no other Ludacris album has achieved a higher position on the chart, and was certified platinum by the Canadian Recording Industry Association on January 8, 2004. In Ireland, the album debuted and peaked at number 71 on the Irish Albums Chart, before exiting the chart the following week: to date, it remains Ludacris' only album to appear on the chart. In the United Kingdom, Chicken-n-Beer achieved a peak position of number 44 on the UK Albums Chart, spending a total of four weeks on the chart – the longest length of time any Ludacris album has lasted on the chart. It also became Ludacris' most commercially successful album in Germany, appearing at number 87 on the German Albums Chart in the only week in which it charted.

Critical response 

Upon its release, Chicken-n-Beer received generally positive reviews from music critics. At Metacritic, which assigns a normalized rating out of 100 to reviews from mainstream critics, the album received an average score of 75, based on 10 reviews, which indicates "generally favorable reviews". John Bush of Allmusic noted Ludacris' "lightning-quick phrasing and cutting wit" and "rollicking, all-in-good-fun persona": he went on to commend the eccentric and upbeat nature of Ludacris' music, calling him "one of the few who's actually celebrating something – and having a great time doing it". Writing for Entertainment Weekly, Neil Drumming praised Ludacris' rapping skills, including his "explosive enunciation", "witty wordplay" and "punchline potency", although he reacted negatively towards the album's newer producers, feeling they use "campy sampling and cartoonish composition". Nathan Rabin of The A.V. Club complimented Ludacris' "impeccable comic timing" and his ability to "wring the most out of every line", although he also noted the album to be Ludacris' most "emotional, autobiographical major-label release to date". Although he dismissed much of the album's production as "duds", Rolling Stone writer Toure praised Ludacris' musical style as appealing to genres outside hip-hop music, calling him "cocksure, witty and just hard enough to be taken seriously" yet "playful enough to be pop": he further noted Ludacris to be one of the most technically skilled rappers of the time, stating:

However, some felt the adult humour displayed on many the songs was excessive, and detracted from Ludacris' technical abilities. Jeffries called Ludacris' personality "cartoonish": Drumming noted "too many cuts are simply one-note jokes stretched out to three or four minutes", and criticized the album's female-orientated material as "cringeworthy, misogynistic snorefests", but admitted Ludacris to be "a funny guy" and called many of the featured insults and boasts "gut-busting... for days". In contrast, Rabin described Ludacris as "fun incarnate, the joyous embodiment of rap's commitment to hedonism at all costs" and felt that few rappers covered sexually-orientated topics as well as Ludacris, "writing few of his peers mine the well-worn topics of freaky sex and drugged-out debauchery with such irreverent glee".

Track listing 

Notes
 (co.) signifies a co-producer

Personnel 
Credits for Chicken-n-Beer adapted from Allmusic.

 Geoff Allen – engineer
 Burt Bacharach – composer
 Ken Bailey – A&R
 Mark Berto – engineer
 Zukhan Bey – composer, producer
 Black Key – producer
 Samuel Branch – engineer
 Ron Browz – producer
 Chingy – guest appearance, vocals
 Sandy Coffee – vocals
 T.F. Cook – composer
 M. Davis – composer
 Mickey Davis – engineer
 Jeff Dixon – marketing
 DJ Nasty – producer
 Dolla Boy – guest appearance, vocals
 Jimmy Douglass – mixing
 William "Poon Daddy" Engram – A&R
 Steve Fisher – engineer
 Cypress Fluellen – vocals
 John Frye – mixing
 Robert Hannon – engineer
 Matt Hennessey – engineer
 Eddie Hernandez – engineer
 Chad Hugo – composer
 Bill Importico – engineer
 Tia Johnson – art direction, design
 Scott Kieklak – engineer
 Portia Kirkland – marketing
 KLC – engineer
 Eritza Laues – vocals
 Lil' Fate – guest appearance, vocals

 Lil Pat – mixing
 Lil' Flip – guest appearance, vocals
 Ludacris – composer, executive producer, producer, vocals
 LVM – producer
 Tasniima Malik – vocals
 Deborah Mannis-Gardner – sample clearance
 MJG – guest appearance, vocals
 Lenny Mollings – Engineer, Keyboards
 Josh Monroy – engineer
 Roger Moody – engineer
 Phil Mucci – collage, photography
 Joel Mullis – engineer
 Erica Novich – A&R
 Jason Rea – engineer
 Patrick "Plain Pat" Reynolds – A&R
 Jason Rome – engineer
 Glenn Schick – mastering
 Erick Sermon – composer, producer
 Shawnna – guest appearance, vocals
 Azuolas Sinkevicius – engineer
 Snoop Dogg – guest appearance, vocals
 Sean Taylor – A&R
 Carl Thomas – guest appearance, vocals
 Tity Boi – guest appearance, vocals
 Michael Tyler – composer
 Kanye West – composer, producer
 Cory Williams – engineer
 Pharrell Williams – composer
 A. Wilson – composer
 Mike "Hitman" Wilson – engineer
 Ruh Anubis "Moby Dick" Yazid – engineer, instrumentation, keyboards, producer
 Chaka Zulu – executive producer, producer

Charts

Weekly charts

Year-end charts

End of decade charts

Certifications

See also
 List of Billboard 200 number-one albums of 2003

References 

Ludacris albums
2003 albums
Def Jam Recordings albums
Albums produced by Kanye West
Albums produced by Erick Sermon
Albums produced by Ron Browz
Disturbing tha Peace albums
Albums produced by the Neptunes
Albums produced by DJ Paul
Albums produced by Juicy J
Comedy hip hop albums